DevTernity is Latvia's largest  international software development conference with an emphasis on software architecture, development best practices and technical leadership. Established in 2015 by the leaders of a non-profit Latvian Software Craftsmanship Community, the conference faces continuous growth and has managed to attract 750 attendees at its peak.

With over 700 attendees, DevTernity 2017 was sold out 6 weeks before the event. In 2018, DevTernity has been mentioned among the best software engineering conferences of 2018. DevTernity has been recognised as a first-class cross-discipline conference in Europe.

The conference features 20 carefully chosen international speakers, performing on 3 parallel tracks. The second conference day is devoted to practical, instructor-led workshops.

In order to provide a welcoming and harassment-free environment for participants of all races, gender and trans statuses, sexual orientations, physical abilities, physical appearances, and beliefs, the conference organizers ensure that Code of Conduct is followed.

The official conference language is English.

All conference talks are recorded and published within a couple of weeks after the event on the conference's official YouTube channel. The official conference video is also available for watching.

History

Location 
DevTernity takes place in The National Library of Latvia also known as Castle of Light – a national cultural institution, that plays an important role in the development of Latvia's information society, providing Internet access to residents and supporting research and lifelong education.

Opening and closing keynotes are presented in the Hall Ziedonis. The hall has excellent audiovisual equipment and acoustics and is recognized as perfectly suitable for chamber music, choral music, and acoustic music sounds.

Speakers 
The conference applies a mixed approach to program development – direct invitation and a public Call For Papers (CFP). All talks undergo a rigorous review process by the conference program committee. All speakers get accommodation costs and traveling expenses within Europe fully covered.

Sponsors 
The conference offers various sponsorship packages, depending on a sponsor's needs. The packages contain online and media advertisement opportunities, banner, private booth installation at the conference venue and much more. Among sponsors are JetBrains, Taxify, Pipedrive, Zabbix, Ubiquiti Networks, Accenture, Visma and many other companies.

References

Computer conferences